Detachment is a 2011 American drama film directed by Tony Kaye and distributed by Tribeca Film. It was written by Carl Lund. Its story follows Henry Barthes, a high-school substitute teacher who becomes a role model to his students and others. It stars Adrien Brody, Marcia Gay Harden, Christina Hendricks, William Petersen, Bryan Cranston, Tim Blake Nelson, Betty Kaye, Sami Gayle, Lucy Liu, Blythe Danner, and James Caan.

The film was produced by Greg Shapiro, Carl Lund, Bingo Gubelmann, Austin Stark, Benji Kohn, and Chris Papavasiliou and was released on March 16, 2012. It grossed $10,739 during its opening weekend and $1.68 million worldwide. It received mixed reviews and has a  approval rating based on  reviews on Rotten Tomatoes.

Synopsis
Detachment is a chronicle of one month in the lives of several high school teachers, administrators and students through the eyes of a substitute teacher named Henry Barthes (Adrien Brody). Barthes' method of imparting vital knowledge to his temporary students is interrupted by the arrival of three women in his life—a damaged and naive sex worker, Erica (Sami Gayle), a fellow teacher, Sarah (Christina Hendricks), and a troubled teen named Meredith (Betty Kaye). These women all have profound effects on Barthes' life, forcing him to both re-discover aspects of his own personality, and to come to terms with both the tragic suicide of his mother and the impending death of his grandfather (Louis Zorich). The film is punctuated with flashbacks of scenes of Barthes' young childhood and his mother's suicide.

Sub-plots include the struggles of Dr. Parker (Lucy Liu) within her role as the school counselor and the painful torment of Principal Dearden (Marcia Gay Harden), who faces her dismissal as head of this deeply flawed school.

Plot
Substitute teacher Henry Barthes is called in for a one-month assignment, teaching English classes at a high school with many students performing at a low grade level. On his first day, he assesses his students' writing skills with an essay regarding how they believe they will be remembered after they die. During this class, he observes many acts of hostility and antagonism, including a student yelling at him and threatening him physically, as well as two students verbally harassing pupil Meredith, whom he becomes acquainted with after class. Later that day, he witnesses more aggression, when the mother of a student who has been expelled for harassing teacher Sarah Madison confronts her.

After school, Henry is called in to the care facility to see his grandfather who is suffering from dementia, as he has locked himself in the bathroom and won't come out. On his way out, after his visit, Henry becomes frustrated with a staff member, as he believes his grandfather isn't being taken care of properly.

On the bus ride home, Henry sees young sex worker, Erica, get hit by a man who refuses to pay her. Erica attempts to convince Henry to have sex with her, which he refuses.

The next day, Henry reads aloud to the class through the essays from earlier. After reading an anonymous essay (which is assumed to be Meredith's), he becomes aware of her struggles with suicidal ideation.

After visiting his grandfather, Henry again runs into Erica, who he invites up to his apartment. There, he feeds her, cleans the cuts and scrapes on her legs, and allows her to stay for the night. Over the next few nights, she is allowed to stay, though he informs her that she won't be able to stay forever.

At school, the staff have a memorial service for a teacher who has passed away, though none of them liked him, nor do they know how he died.

Later, a speaker gives a talk to the faculty, discussing how the low test scores are bringing down real-estate prices, outraging the exhausted teachers. It is revealed there that Principal Carol Dearden is being fired soon. After the talk, Sarah asks Henry back to her house for dinner. When Henry returns home late, Erica is still awake, waiting for him. She is upset that he went out without telling her, to which he informs her that she can't expect him to tell her such things. However, Henry believes that Erica is showing responsibility, since she went grocery shopping and prepared dinner, which he is pleased with.

Back at school, the counsellor Dr. Parker talks to a student, Missy, about her low grades and lack of ambition, to which she seems to lack any care about. Dr. Parker tries to tell Missy about the importance of education later in life, but she loses her composure as she expresses her frustrations over her own life, which has supposedly not gone how she wished.

Henry is later called into the care facility, where Erica has been waiting for him, because his grandfather has become gravely ill. Henry's grandfather is scared, as he believes he is responsible for the disquiet in Henry's life, and he feels that he cannot leave him. Henry tells his grandfather that he's done nothing wrong and he can let himself go if he wants to. After their visit, Henry and Erica go to the park, where Erica asks about Henry's mother. He details her suicide, the result of an overdose. He also implies that his grandfather had sexually abused his mother, but says that he never felt unsafe around either of them.

The next day at school, Meredith shows Henry an artwork that she made for him. After she mentions that Henry seems like he needs someone to talk to, Henry becomes concerned, as he believes she is referring to herself. When Meredith opens up about her struggles and becomes visibly upset, Henry tries to comfort her. She hugs him, now very upset, asking Henry to console her. Sarah walks in on them (causing Meredith to run away) and expresses her concern that Henry was acting inappropriately towards Meredith. Henry insists that he was just comforting her. However, becoming so horrified by even the mention of committing such acts himself, Henry begins panicking and is overcome by memories of his mother and grandfather.

Later that day, Henry is informed that his grandfather has died. Feeling on-edge after all that's happened, Henry informs Erica he can no longer take care of her, and has social services take her to a foster home. She becomes very upset, begging him to let her stay, but he reluctantly maintains his stance.

The next day at school, Meredith has set up a cupcake stall. Henry goes to talk to her about the day before, still trying to console her, but she seems reluctant to talk to him. She then eats one of her cupcakes, which she laced with poison, and commits suicide.

Later, he decides to go visit Erica in the foster care facility. She euphorically embraces him.

On his last day of teaching, Henry reads to the class The Fall of the House of Usher by Edgar Allen Poe.

Cast

Production
Filming took place in Mineola Middle School and Mineola High School on Long Island, New York.

In March 2012, cast member Bryan Cranston was asked about Detachment during an interview for Collider. The reporter told Cranston that he loved the movie and then started to ask his question. "Wait," Cranston said, "did you like 'Detachment'?" The reporter said again that he loved it, and Cranston seemed surprised. "I haven't seen it," he told the assembled press. "I'm surprised to hear that actually." When asked to clarify, he continued, "Because I felt that Carl Lund, the writer of 'Detachment,' wrote a really beautiful, haunting script. And I didn't feel that it was honored."
Shocked by Cranston's frankness, the reporters pushed him for more on that disagreement. "I was upset with that. I really was. And so I didn't see the movie." He sighed, resigned, and continued, after searching for the right way to phrase himself, "Tony Kaye is a very complicated… interesting fellow." He smiled as he chose his words carefully. "I don't believe that I'll be working with him again. I didn't not get along with him on a personal level. But I just honor the writing. I really think that writing is the most important element there is. It is the springboard. It is where everything starts. And if you don't honor that -- which I didn't feel it was -- then where are you?" He leaned in as if telling everyone a secret. "And I'm not the only actor on that film to feel that way."

In the same month, director Tony Kaye touched upon the issue in a separate interview. "My agent sent me this fantastic piece of writing by a guy called Carl Lund. A writer. One of the things that I felt was how real it was. And writing is really about research and speech and I thought this guy’s really done his homework. In fact it turned out that he had been a teacher. So then it all became very clear. And then when it really began, if you like, really really began was when Adrien Brody sort of popped up and said I’ll do this. A couple of weeks before we were supposed to start to shoot. And then I decided myself at that point I’m gonna hang the whole thing on you [Brody]. And try to build out your character of Henry much more and make it all everything about you. Just you.” The interviewer then asks Kaye if he rebuilt the script at that point. Kaye responds, “Well I reinterpreted it, yeah. When Carl first wrote it, I believe it was a very vignette ensemble thing." ”Carl's script was very impressionistic, and [a] part of what I do, sometimes, [is] very impressionistic storytelling. I used that to its full, here, to try and make sense of it all.... There's more [footage] of Marcia Gay Harden and Bryan Cranston [which] I've got in the hard drives, and I'm hoping to [get] it out, in maybe a longer cut." 

ReleaseDetachment premiered on April 25, 2011, at the Tribeca Film Festival. Pretty Pictures acquired rights to distribute the film in France. In September 2011, Tribeca Film acquired U.S. distribution rights with Celluloid Dreams repping worldwide sales rights. Territories sold include Benelux (Wild Bunch), Italy (UBU), Middle East (Shooting Stars), Russia (CP Digital), Latin America (California), India (Pictureworks), Malaysia, Indonesia and Vietnam (PT Parkit) and Taiwan (Cineplex).

On September 9, 2011, Detachment screened in competition at the 37th Deauville American Film Festival in France. It won both the Revelations Prize and the International Critics' Award. On September 18, Detachment was announced as the Closing Night Film at the Woodstock Film Festival, where Kaye was the recipient of the Honorary Maverick Award.

On October 12, 2011, Detachment screened in competition at the Valenciennes International Festival of Action and Adventure Films in France, where it won the Grand Prize and the Audience Award. Later, on October 26, the film screened in competition at the 24th Tokyo International Film Festival. It received the award for Best Artistic Contribution, sharing honors with the film Kora.Detachment also screened in competition at the 35th São Paulo International Film Festival and won the Audience Award for Best Foreign Language Film, sharing honors with Chicken with Plums. On November 16, Detachment screened at the 53rd Muestra Internacional de Cine in Mexico.

In January 2012, Detachment won Best Picture at the Ramdam Film Festival in Tournai, Belgium.

Critical response

The website's critics consensus reads: "Detachments heart is in the right place, but overall it doesn't offer any solutions to its passionate ranting." On Metacritic, the film has a weighted average score of 52% based on reviews from 20 critics.

Peter Travers from Rolling Stone awarded the film three out of four stars, praising the performances of Adrien Brody, Marcia Gay Harden and Lucy Liu. "Detachment gets to you. It hits hard", he wrote.

A reviewer for Student Handouts, which reviews books and films for those working in education, said: "It easily makes Dangerous Minds'' look like a pandering Lifetime made-for-TV movie."

References

External links
 
 

2011 films
2011 independent films
Films about educators
Films about suicide
2011 comedy-drama films
Films shot in New York (state)
Films directed by Tony Kaye (director)
Films scored by the Newton Brothers
American comedy-drama films
Appian Way Productions films
2010s English-language films
2010s American films